Centerm is short for Centennial Terminals, a major dock in Vancouver's East Side.

It is one of four container terminals at the Port of Vancouver, the others being Vanterm, Deltaport, and Roberts Bank. Combined they handled 1.94 million containers in 2020.

Construction
Building rubble was dumped on the foreshore at Main Street and a peninsula where the Hastings Mill once sat and a massive terminal was created at the behest of Barney Johnson with Federal money in 1958, hence the Centennial Year and name  (BC's 100's birthday). It was operated by Canadian Stevedoring, before management was taken over by the port authority itself.

As of 2020 there is an expansion underway to considerably increase the capacity of Centerm.

References

Container terminals
Ports and harbours of British Columbia
Buildings and structures in Vancouver